The men's 4x100 m freestyle relay event at the 2010 South American Games was held on March 29 at 19:20.

Medalists

Records

Results

Final

References
Men's 4x100m Freestyle Results, page 39

Freestyle Relay 4x100m M